"" is the 21st single by Zard, released on 2 July 1997 by B-Gram Records. The single reached #3 in the charts in its first week, stayed in the charts for 8 weeks and sold over 281,000 copies.

Track list

Use in media
"Kaze ga Toori Nukeru Machi he" was used as campaigning song for Japan Racing Association of "'97 Summer JRA".
A cover of the coupling song "Tooi Hoshi wo Oshiete" by Sard Underground was used as the ending theme for the 2021 drama Nishiogikubo Mitsuboshi Youshudo.

References

1997 singles
Zard songs
Songs written by Izumi Sakai
Songs written by Tetsurō Oda
1997 songs